Erwin Vogt (born 17 September 1931) is a Swiss former sports shooter. He competed at the 1964, 1968 and the 1972 Summer Olympics.

References

External links
 

1931 births
Living people
Swiss male sport shooters
Olympic shooters of Switzerland
Shooters at the 1964 Summer Olympics
Shooters at the 1968 Summer Olympics
Shooters at the 1972 Summer Olympics
Sportspeople from Basel-Landschaft